Nicos Baikas (born in Piraeus, 1948) is a Greek artist who lives and works in Athens. He started his art studies in 1967 at the Athens School of Fine Arts and later studied at the Accademia di Belle Arti in Florence. He started exhibiting his works in the 1980s and achieved some notability in Germany after his participation in the Documenta 9 art exhibition, in 1992. His work is a synthesis of words and images, usually performed with pencil on paper in black and white.

Selected personal exhibitions 
2001 Basilica of Saint Mark Iraklion, Crete
1994 Centre d’ Art Contemporain, Geneva

Selected group exhibitions 
2016 Athens, EMST National Museum of Contemporary Art, "Urgent Conversations, Athens- Antwerp"
2010 Herford, Museum MARTa Herford, I Really Don’t Know What Art Is: Insights into a Private Collection
2003 Rome, MAXXI (Museo nazionale delle arti del XXI secolo), Le collezioni: acquisizioni di arte contemporanea
2002 Kassel, Neue Galerie, Staatliche Museen Kassel, Documenta-Erwerbungen für die Neue Galerie.
1993 Ghent, S.M.A.K. Museum of Contemporary Art, In Extenso / acquisitions 1989-1992
Antwerp, Antwerp Cultural Capital, Europese Ontmoetingen
1992 Kassel, Documenta IX
Ghent, S.M.A.K. Museum of Contemporary Art, Edition – Documenta IX
Aalst Belfort, Cultural Centre De Werf, Belfry, Stedelijk Museum, Papier Beeld & Basis
1991 Paris, Fondation Cartier pour l'Art Contemporain, Lignes de mire 2
1990 Paris, Fondation Cartier pour l'Art Contemporain, Carnet de Voyages
1989 Athens, Deste Foundation, Psychological Abstraction
Deurle, Europese Raaklijnen
1986 Brussels, Palais des Beaux Arts, Au coeur du Maelström
1984 Thessaloniki, Municipal Art Gallery (Thessaloniki), 5 Greek Artists
1981 Brussels, Palais des Beaux Arts, Art International d'Aujourd'hui, J.P. 3

Selected bibliography
Jan Hoet: "Nicos Baikas" in catalogue "Art International d'Aujourd' hui" J.P.3 Palais des Beaux Arts, Brussels, 1981.
Catalogue of the collection, Museum of Contemporary Art. S.M.A.K., Gent, 1982.
"Au coeur du Maelström", catalogue, Palais des Beaux Arts, Brussels, 1986.
Benoit Angelet: "Interview with Nicos Baikas", Artefactum 17/1987, Antwerp.
Mario Diacono: "The obscure light of exactitude", text in one-man show, Mario Diacono Gallery, Boston,1987.
Catalogue of the collection, Museum of Contemporary Art, S.M.A.K., Ghent, 1988.
Bart de Baere: "Nicos Baikas, a conversation on pencil, light and darkness", interview,  24-3-1989, Ghent.
Luck Lambrecht: "Nicos Baikas" in catalogue "Europese Raaklijnen", Museum Dhondt-Dhaenens, Deurle, 1989.
"Psychological Abstraction”, catalogue, Deste foundation, Athens, 1989
Ezio Quarantelli: "Nicos Baikas", text and interview, Contemporanea 17/1990, Turin.
Anastasia Manos: Interview with N. Baikas in catalogue "Carnet de Voyages", Fondation Cartier pour l'Art Contemporain, Paris, 1990.
Jean de Loisy, entretien avec Oscarine Bosquet, "Sur les pas d’un checheur d'Art", Beaux Arts, 86/1991, Paris.
Texts by N. Baikas and interview by A. Manos, Arti 5/summer 1991, Athens.
Documenta IX. Catalogue, Kassel 1992.
"Documenta als Motor", Kunstforum International 119/summer 1992, Cologne.
"Papier Beeld & Basis", catalogue, Belfort, Aalst, 1992.
"Nicos Baikas", catalogue of Centre d' Art Contemporain de Geneva, 1994.
Paolo Colombo: "A few thoughts on Baikas" Arti19/ March –April 1994, Athens.
C. Cafopoulos : "Nicos Baikas" in Artforum, March 1996.
Gianni Romano: "Bloom: Contemporary Art Garden", catalogue, Gotham editions, Milan, 1999.
"Nicos Baikas", catalogue of the exhibition at the Basilica of St. Mark, texts by D. Davvetas & N. Baikas, Iraklion Crete, 2001.
Marianne Heinz: Documenta-Erwerbungen für die Neue Galerie. Catalogue, 2002.
"Le Collezioni 1985-2008", catalogue, Galleria Nazionale d’Arte Moderna & MAXXI, Mondatori Electa Editions, Rome, 2009.
"Ich weiß gar nicht, was Kunst ist", catalogue, MARTa Herford, Herford, 2010

References

1948 births
Living people
Greek artists
Artists from Piraeus